Kellamballi is a small village in Chamarajanagar district of Karnataka state, India.

Location
Kellamballi is located between Nanjangud town and Chamarajanagar town on Mysore Chamarajanagar main road. Kellamballi is at a distance of two kilometers from Chamarajanagar town.

Access
Kellamballi village is easily accessible from Mysore-Chamarajanagar main road.  There is a railway station in the village which is called Mariyala Gangavadi railway station.

Post office
There is a post office (Zilla Adalitha Bhavan) at Kellamballi village and the postal code is  571313.

Demographics
The people of Kellamballi are chiefly agrarian. A few work in government establishments in Chamarajanagar town. The population of the village is 2,342 living in 513 houses.  The area of the village is  1060 hectares.

Economy
The provincial government has started a Rs.400 crore project on 1`,595 acres of land called Badanaguppe-Kellamballi Industrial Estate which will include sectors like automobile, food processing, textiles, leather, granite and agriculture related industries.

Education
 Kellambally School
 Murukaraj First Grade College

Places of worship
There is a prominent Hindu ashram called Murukaraj Matt in this village. There is also a little church of the catholic sect in the middle of the village square.

See also
 Badanaguppe
 Mariyala
 Chamarajanagar
 Mariyala Gangavadi railway station
 Mysore Chamarajanagar branch line

Image gallery

References

Villages in Chamarajanagar district